LNU may refer to:

Universities
Leyte Normal University, Tacloban City, Philippines
Liaoning Normal University, a teacher training university in China
Lingnan Normal University, Zhanjiang City, Guangdong Province, China
Linnaeus University, Växjö and Kalmar, Sweden
University of Luhansk, Ukraine
University of Lviv, Ukraine

Other
Fnu Lnu (Last Name Unknown), a placeholder name
The , a member of the World Assembly of Youth
League of Nations Union, a British organisation advocating peace and disarmament
Lincolnshire Naturalists' Union, a British natural history society formed in 1893.
Longuda language (ISO 639:lnu), a Niger–Congo language of Nigeria
Mi'kmaq people or Lnu, a First Nations People of North America
Robert Atty Bessing Airport (IATA: LNU), Malinau, North Kalimantan, Indonesia
Sonoma-Lake-Napa Unit, an operational unit of the California Department of Forestry and Fire Protection
LNU Lightning Complex fires, a group of wildfires in California